The 1981 European Amateur Team Championship took place 24–28 June at the Old Course at St Andrews, Scotland. It was the 12th men's golf European Amateur Team Championship.

Venue

The Old Course at St Andrews is considered to be the "home of golf" because the sport was first played on the links at St Andrews in the early 15th century. It had previously hosted The Open Championship 22 times, more than any other course, and has since continued to be one of the golf courses in the Open Championship hosting course rotation.

For the 1981 European Amateur Team Championship, the course was set up with par 72 over 6,933 yards.

Format 
Each team consisted of five or six players, playing two rounds of stroke-play over two days, counting the five best scores each day for each team.

The eight best teams formed flight A, in knock-out match-play over the next three days. The teams were seeded based on their positions after the stroke play. The first placed team were drawn to play the quarter final against the eight placed team, the second against the seventh, the third against the sixth and the fourth against the fifth. Teams were allowed to use six players during the team matches, selecting four of them in the two morning foursome games and five players in to the afternoon single games. Games all square at the 18th hole were declared halved, if the team match was already decided.

The eight teams placed 9–16 in the qualification stroke-play formed flight B, to play similar knock-out play, and the three teams placed 17–19 formed flight C, to play all against each other, to decide their final positions.

Teams 
19 nation teams contested the event. Each team consisted of five or six players.

Players in the leading teams

Other participating teams

Winners 
Team France won the opening 36-hole stroke-play qualifying competition, despite playing with only five players and having to count all five scores, because of an arm injury to team member Roger Lagarde, who could not play.

There was no official award for the lowest individual score, but individual leader was François Illouz, France, with a score of 2-under-par 142, one stroke ahead of Philip Walton, Ireland.

Defending champions team England won the gold medal, earning their sixth title, beating host country Scotland in the final 4–3. The last and deciding game, between Peter Deeble, England, and Ian Hutcheon, Scotland, went on to the 20th hole, in beginning darkness. Hutcheon had made a necessary birdie on the 18th to tie the match and holed a chip shot on the first extra hole to survive after hitting in to the Swilcan Burn, but Deeble won the 20th hole and the championship for England.

Team Wales earned the bronze on third place, after beating France 4–3 in the bronze match.

Results 
Qualification round

Team standings

Individual leaders

 Note: There was no official award for the lowest individual scores.

Flight A

Bracket

Final games

Flight B

Bracket

Flight C

Final standings

Sources:

See also 
 Eisenhower Trophy – biennial world amateur team golf championship for men organized by the International Golf Federation.
 European Ladies' Team Championship – European amateur team golf championship for women organised by the European Golf Association.

References

External links 
 European Golf Association: Full results

European Amateur Team Championship
Golf tournaments in Scotland
European Amateur Team Championship
European Amateur Team Championship
European Amateur Team Championship